Lucie Miller is a character in a series of audio plays produced by Big Finish Productions for BBC7 based on the long-running British science fiction television series Doctor Who.  She is a companion of the Eighth Doctor, and is voiced  by Sheridan Smith.

The Eighth Doctor mentions her, as well as other audio companions, in the mini-episode "The Night of the Doctor", leading many fans to consider them to be canonically part of the Whoniverse.

Character history
The character's first appearance is in Blood of the Daleks.  She is described as being a "strong willed northern lass," and is initially an unwilling passenger in the TARDIS, having seemingly been placed with the Doctor as part of a Time Lord witness protection programme. Lucie tells the Doctor that the Time Lords have placed her in his care because she has seen something important, but doesn't know what.  Her initial attitude towards the Doctor is disdainful, but she recognizes that he's "about saving worlds".

In Horror of Glam Rock, the character unexpectedly encounters her 'Auntie Pat', Patricia Ryder, the drummer of a failed band called Methylated Spirits, in 1974. As this is over a decade before Lucie is born, Pat is skeptical, but grows to like her as the story develops.

After several more adventures with the Doctor, the events of Human Resources reveal much of the mystery surrounding Lucie: the Time Lords learned that the Celestial Intervention Agency have been tracking Lucie because they believe she would become a terrible future dictator within Europe, and attempt to alter her present to prevent this.  But when she applies for a job in an office building, which is part of another CIA plot to destroy the Cybermen, the Time Lords place her with the Doctor to protect her from the effects of exposure to too much CIA technology.  But in reality, a woman named Karen, who had been interviewed on the same day as Lucie, is the actual future dictator, and the Time Lords have either been tricked or simply made a mistake. At the end of the story Lucie and the Doctor continue to travel together in the TARDIS.

Lucie meets her Aunty Pat again in The Zygon Who Fell to Earth, set about a decade after Glam Rock.  Pat has now married a Zygon who has rejected the warrior ways of his people.  But when his superiors come looking for him, Pat is murdered. Her husband, unwilling to tell Lucie, permanently takes on Pat's form, becoming the Aunty Pat that Lucie grew up knowing.  The Doctor finds out about this, but is sworn to secrecy to protect the timeline.

At the end of Vengeance of Morbius, the Doctor is seemingly killed while trying to prevent the Time Lords from being overthrown by the resurrected Morbius (The Brain of Morbius). They send her home and she resumes her normal life.  However, six months later, she is kidnapped by The Headhunter, who has taken the Doctor's abandoned TARDIS, and together they locate him on an obscure water planet called Orbis, where he has been quietly living for the last 600 years of his life.  Orbis is then suddenly destroyed and the Doctor and Lucie resume traveling in the TARDIS, the Headhunter observing that the universe needs the Doctor to properly protect it.

In The Eight Truths and Worldwide Web, Lucie is manipulated and brainwashed by 'self-health' group the Eightfold Truth into acting as the host for the Queen of the Eight-Legs- the Giant Spiders of Metebelis Three (Planet of the Spiders)- but despite being in a coma for a month as the result of an attack, the Doctor is able to restore Lucie and banish the Queen with the aid of the Headhunter, their former adversary sacrificing herself to trap the Queen.

In Death in Blackpool, Lucie discovers the truth about her Aunty Pat being a Zygon.  She also learns that the Doctor knew and didn't tell her.  She sees this as a betrayal of their trust and chooses to stay home, parting ways with the Doctor.

The character reappears, although disguised, in The Book of Kells as assistant to the Time Lord: The Meddling Monk. She had responded to a classified advert asking for a time travel companion. In time, Lucie realizes that the Monk isn't as altruistic as he claims, when he triggers an avalanche to destroy a village, killing six hundred innocent people to kill the parents of a future dictator. At the end of Deimos, The Doctor discovers that she has been abandoned by the Monk. She is then reunited with the Doctor in the following The Resurrection of Mars becoming his companion while Tamsin Drew goes with the Monk in Lucie's place, Tamsin persuaded to regard the Doctor as evil for letting historical disasters unfold as they should where Lucie can recognize the moral complexities of time travel.

She spent Christmas in the TARDIS with the Doctor's granddaughter Susan and her son Alex.  Afterward she joined them on 22nd century Earth, touring Eurasia with Alex.  Meanwhile, the Doctor spent six years imprisoned in a bunker inside a sun.  He was provided with a succession of four robot assistants, all of them modeled after Lucie, convinced that he was needed to keep the sun stable.  As soon as he escaped, he received a distress call from the real Lucie.

In the two-parter Lucie Miller / To the Death Lucie falls victim to a plague distributed by the Daleks in order to aid their second invasion of Earth, which has also been aided by the Monk and Tamsin (although Tamsin is unaware of the Monk's role in causing the invasion). After several months of illness, she recovers but remains crippled and blind in one eye. Despite this, she joins Alex and Susan in a rebellion, stealing a Dalek Saucer containing a nuclear device, and crashes it into the Dalek mines that they had intended to use to replace Earth's core with a time engine. Lucie's sacrifice destroys the Daleks and saves the universe, killing herself in the process. Her death, along with the deaths of Alex and Tamsin (Tamsin killed by the Daleks to punish the Monk and Alex sacrificing himself to distract the Daleks at a crucial moment), leave the Doctor broken and without hope, the repercussions of which are dealt with in Dark Eyes.

The Eighth Doctor mentions Lucie by name (along with other audio companions) in the 2013 mini-episode, "The Night of the Doctor", which features his regeneration into the War Doctor.

List of appearances

Big Finish Eighth Doctor audio adventures
Blood of the Daleks
Horror of Glam Rock
Immortal Beloved
Phobos
No More Lies
Human Resources
Dead London
Max Warp
Brave New Town
The Skull of Sobek
Grand Theft Cosmos
The Zygon Who Fell to Earth
Sisters of the Flame / Vengeance of Morbius
Orbis
Hothouse
The Beast of Orlok
Wirrn Dawn
Scapegoat
The Cannibalists
The Eight Truths
Worldwide Web
Death in Blackpool
The Book of Kells
Deimos / The Resurrection of Mars
Relative Dimensions
Prisoner of the Sun (cameo & robot simulants)
Lucie Miller / To the Death
The Further Adventures of Lucie Miller

Short Trips audios
All the Fun of the Fair

Short stories
"Remain in Light" by Eddie Robson (Short Trips: Snapshots)
"Decorative Purposes" by Eddie Robson (Short Trips: The Ghosts of Christmas)
"The Great Escapes" by Simon Guerrier (Short Trips: Defining Patterns)

References

External links

Doctor Who audio characters
Doctor Who spin-off companions